Frizzled-8 (Fz-8) is a protein that in humans is encoded by the FZD8 gene.

Function 

This intronless gene is a member of the frizzled gene family. Members of this family encode seven-transmembrane domain proteins that are receptors for the Wingless type MMTV integration site family of signaling proteins. Most frizzled receptors are coupled to the beta-catenin canonical signaling pathway. This gene is highly expressed in two human cancer cell lines, indicating that it may play a role in several types of cancer. The crystal structure of the extracellular cysteine-rich domain of a similar mouse protein has been determined.

References

Further reading

External links

 

G protein-coupled receptors